"Secrets" is a song by Canadian singer the Weeknd from his third studio album Starboy (2016). The song was written and produced by the Weeknd, Martin "Doc" McKinney, and Henry "Cirkut" Walter, with Dylan Wiggins, Roland Orzabal, Coz Canler, Jimmy Marinos, Wally Palamarchuk, Mike Skill, and Peter Solley receiving writing credits for the sampling of the new wave songs "Pale Shelter" by Tears for Fears and "Talking in Your Sleep" by the Romantics. "Secrets" was released to radio in Italy on November 10, 2017, as the album's final international single.

Chart performance
"Secrets" peaked at number 47 on the US Billboard Hot 100. It also peaked at number 27 on the Canadian Hot 100.

Music video
The music video for "Secrets" was directed by Pedro Martin-Calero and was filmed at the University of Toronto Scarborough and the Toronto Reference Library. It was released on June 11, 2017, and features singer Black Atlass.

Charts

Weekly charts

Year-end charts

Certifications

Release history

References

2016 songs
2017 singles
The Weeknd songs
Songs written by Doc McKinney
Songs written by Roland Orzabal
Songs written by the Weeknd
XO (record label) singles
Republic Records singles
Songs written by Cirkut (record producer)
Song recordings produced by the Weeknd
Song recordings produced by Cirkut (record producer)
Songs written by Dylan Wiggins